The 1966 San Diego State Aztecs football team represented San Diego State College during the 1966 NCAA College Division football season. San Diego State competed in the California Collegiate Athletic Association (CCAA). The team was led by head coach Don Coryell, in his sixth year, and played home games at both Aztec Bowl and Balboa Stadium.

They finished the season as champions of the CCAA, undefeated and untied with eleven wins and zero losses (11–0, 5–0 CCAA). The Aztecs finished the season ranked number 1 in both the AP Small College Football Poll and the UPI Small College Football Poll. The offense scored 317 points during the season, while the defense only gave up 105.

At the end of the regular season, San Diego State qualified for the Camellia Bowl, which at the time was the Western Regional Final in the College Division of the NCAA. The Aztecs beat Montana State in the game, 28–7. The Aztecs were voted the College Division national champion at the end of the season.

Schedule

Team players in the NFL/AFL
The following San Diego State players were selected in the 1967 NFL Draft.

Team awards

Notes

References

San Diego State
San Diego State Aztecs football seasons
NCAA Small College Football Champions
California Collegiate Athletic Association football champion seasons
College football undefeated seasons
San Diego State Aztecs football